Culex (Culex) pseudovishnui is a species complex of mosquito belonging to the Culex vishnui group of the genus Culex. It is found in Bangladesh, Cambodia, China, Hong Kong, India, Indonesia, Iran, Iraq, Japan, South Korea, Laos, Macau, Malaysia, Nepal, New Guinea (Island); Papua New Guinea, Pakistan, Philippines, Singapore, Sri Lanka, Thailand, Taiwan and Vietnam. It is a major vector of West Nile virus, and Japanese encephalitis virus Larvae can be found from the edges of rice fields. Adults can bite vertebrates from both indoor and outdoor places with a peak biting time on 7pm onwards.

References

External links 
Biosystematics ofCulex vishnui andCulex pseudovishnui based on ecobehavioural pattern

Ecology of four potential culex vectors - NSF DL
The Systematics of Culex vishnui Complex in Southeast Asia
Semiochemicals of Culex pseudovishnui
Identification of Culex sp. (Adult)
Transmission of Japanese encephalitis virus in Culex pseudovishnui & C. tritaeniorhynchus mosquitoes.
Isolation of Japanese encephalitis virus from Culex pseudovishnui Colless, 1957 (Diptera: Culicidae) in Goa.

pseudovishnui
Insects described in 1957